The Absaroka Range ( or ) is a sub-range of the Rocky Mountains in the United States. The range borders the Beartooth Mountains to the north and the Wind River Range to the south. The northern edge of the range rests along I-90 and Livingston, Montana.

Geography
The range is drained by the Yellowstone River and various tributaries, including the Bighorn River.

Most of the range lies within protected lands including Yellowstone Park, the Absaroka-Beartooth Wilderness, North Absaroka Wilderness, Teton Wilderness, and Washakie Wilderness, spanning the Bridger-Teton National Forest, Custer National Forest, Gallatin National Forest, and Shoshone National Forest.

U.S. Highway 212 from Billings, Montana to Yellowstone climbs over Beartooth Pass  in the neighboring Beartooth Mountains before winding through the Absarokas to the northeast gate of Yellowstone National Park. It is only open during the summer. U.S Route 14/16/20 follows the Shoshone River from Cody through the range to the eastern gate of the park.

History
The range is named after the Absaroka Native People. The name is derived from the Hidatsa name for the Crow people; it means "children of the large-beaked bird." (In contrast, the Crow name, Awaxaawe Báaxxioo, means "Pointed Mountains [Like Sand Castles].")

John Colter, who may have been the first white person to visit the area, probably traveled along the foot of the Absarokas in 1807 during his reconnaissance of the Yellowstone region. Early explorers also included Gustavus Cheyney Doane and Nathaniel P. Langford, who climbed the summit of Colter Peak in 1870.

The proposed state of Absaroka shared the same age with the mountain range. The USS Absaroka was named after this mountain range.

Geology
Geologically, the section of the range in Wyoming consists of volcanic breccia, whereas there is a transition to granite and gneiss bedrock  further north of the state line.

Absaroka Volcanic Province
These extrusive rocks were erupted during the Eocene  Epoch of the Paleogene Period. The eroded remnants of many large stratovolcanoes are found in the area. The dissection of these long extinct volcanoes by erosion allows geologists to see volcanic structures that are impossible to see in active volcanoes. Many terms now widely used in volcanology originated in nineteenth century field studies of these ancient volcanoes.

Gallery

See also
 List of mountains and mountain ranges of Yellowstone National Park
 List of mountain ranges in Montana
 List of mountain ranges in Wyoming

References

External links

Ranges of the Rocky Mountains
Mountain ranges of Wyoming
Mountain ranges of Montana
Greater Yellowstone Ecosystem
Landforms of Park County, Montana